The 2023 Louisiana Ragin' Cajuns football team will represent the University of Louisiana at Lafayette in the 2023 NCAA Division I FBS football season. The Ragin' Cajuns played their home games at Cajun Field in Lafayette, Louisiana, and competed in the West Division of the Sun Belt Conference. They are led by second head coach Michael Desormeaux.

Previous season

The Ragin' Cajuns finished the 2022 season 6–7, 4–4 in Sun Belt play to finish forth place in the West Division. They lost to Houston 23–16 in the Independence Bowl.

Schedule
The football schedule was announced February 24, 2023.

References

Louisiana
Louisiana Ragin' Cajuns football seasons
Louisiana Ragin' Cajuns football